This is a list of electoral results for the Electoral district of Canning in Western Australian state elections.

Members for Canning

Election results

Elections in the 1980s

Elections in the 1970s

Elections in the 1960s

Elections in the 1950s 

Two party preferred vote was estimated.

Elections in the 1940s 

 Preferences were not distributed.

Elections in the 1930s 

! colspan="6" style="text-align:left;" |After distribution of preferences

 Preferences were not distributed to completion.

Elections in the 1920s

Elections in the 1910s 

 Preferences were not distributed.

Elections in the 1900s

Elections in the 1890s

References

Western Australian state electoral results by district